The Heart of a Cult is a 2006 novel  by American author Lena Phoenix. It was inspired by her personal experiences in the alternative spiritual realm. The book is written in the style of a personal diary and a segment of the life of thirty-year-old Michelle Thomson, who, during a period of unemployment, goes to a spiritual seminar. The seminar experience leads her into the depths of a cult, from which she must win her freedom, leading to the narrator's growth. The book gained approval from regional websites and some internet reviewers.

The Heart of a Cult won the Independent Publisher's 2007 Visionary Fiction Silver Medal.

Critical Reaction
Review - Cultic Studies Review
Review - Chicago Center for Literature and Photography

Publication information
Lena Phoenix. The Heart of a Cult. Garuda: 2006. .

Footnotes

External links
Lena Phoenix's home pag

2006 American novels
Fictional diaries